Música en ti is the second soundtrack album of the series Soy Luna, titled Soy Luna: Música en ti was scheduled to be released on August 26, 2016.

The CD was recorded during the second part of the first season of the series, with songs recorded from the beginning, such as "A rodar mi vida". The CD was released in Latin America on August 26, the same day that the first season of the series ended.

The title song is interpreted by the protagonist of the series, Karol Sevilla. The CD has other hits such as "Que más da", "Tengo un corazón", "Vuelo" and "Chicas así".

The CD includes songs from the first season of the serie, the opening, "Alas", performed by the protagonist Karol Sevilla live, as well as 2 other songs from the first CD (also live), "Eres" and "Valiente".

In Italy the CD was released with the title "Solo Tu", containing a bonus track that is a version of the song "Que más da", with excerpts from Italian and Spanish music.

Track listing

Charts

Weekly charts

Year-end charts

References

Soy Luna albums
2016 soundtrack albums
Latin pop soundtracks